Jamil Tyrique Daniel Awoyejo (born 21 June 2001) is an English professional footballer who last played as a defender for AFC Wimbledon.

Career
On 13 November 2019, after progressing through AFC Wimbledon's academy, Awoyejo made his debut for the club in a 3–1 EFL Trophy loss against Southend United. In December 2019, Awojeyo joined Isthmian League South Central Division club South Park on loan, scoring on his debut on 7 December 2019, in a 4–2 victory against Bracknell Town.

Career statistics

References

2001 births
Living people
Association football defenders
Footballers from the London Borough of Southwark
English footballers
AFC Wimbledon players
South Park F.C. players
Black British sportspeople